Muhlenbergia utilis is a species of grass known by the common name aparejograss.

Distribution
It is native to North and Central America, where it can be found throughout the south-western United States and California, through Mexico, as far south as Costa Rica. It grows in wet habitats, including riverbanks and meadows, sometimes in alkaline soils.

Description
Muhlenbergia utilis is a rhizomatous perennial grass producing decumbent stems up to about 30 centimeters long. The leaves are no more than 3 to 5 centimeters long and just a few millimeters wide. The inflorescence is a small, narrow, partially sheathed series of short branches bearing small spikelets.

External links
Jepson Manual Treatment - Muhlenbergia utilis
USDA Plants Profile; Muhlenbergia utilis
Grass Manual Treatment
Muhlenbergia utilis - Photo gallery

utilis
Bunchgrasses of North America
Grasses of Mexico
Grasses of the United States
Native grasses of California
Flora of Central America
Flora of Costa Rica
Flora of Northwestern Mexico
Flora of the Southwestern United States
Flora of New Mexico
Natural history of the California chaparral and woodlands
Natural history of the Transverse Ranges